is an English land law case, concerning the behaviour of receivers appointed under mortgages. It affirmed the proposition that a lender (and its agents or receivers) are not required to incur expenses that would likely delay a sale beyond the normal period of marketing.

Facts
In 1996, Royal Bank of Scotland (RBS) appointed receivers over 33 properties mortgaged by Silven Properties to it, and proceeded to sell them off. The receivers explored planning and letting out the properties, but decided to sell them straight away. Silven alleged that RBS's receivers were under a duty to maximise the value by getting planning permission for development and letting out of vacant properties.

In the Chancery Division, Patten J held that neither the mortgagee nor receiver were required to incur expenses that would likely delay a sale beyond the normal period of marketing. This was supported by the cases of Cuckmere Brick Co v Mutual Finance, Downsview Nominees Ltd v First City Corporation Ltd, and Medforth v Blake.

Judgment
Lightman J held that RBS had not breached its duty. A duty is owed in equity (rather than tort) but it was not breached on the facts.

 The mortgagee is entitled to sell the mortgaged property as it is, but is under no obligation to improve it or increase its value.
 The mortgagee is free (in his own interest as well as that of the mortgagor) to investigate whether and how he can "unlock" the potential for an increase in value of the property mortgaged, but he is likewise free at any time to halt his efforts and proceed instead immediately with a sale.
 If the mortgagor requires protection in any of these respects, whether by imposing further duties on the mortgagee or limitations on his rights and powers, he must insist upon them when the bargain is made and upon the inclusion of protective provisions in the mortgage. The one method available to the mortgagor to prevent the mortgagee from exercising his rights is to redeem the mortgage.

Impact

Silven's reasoning was also held to apply to other forms of mortgages in  Den Norske Bank ASA v Acemex Management Company Ltd. which was handed down several days later. As Longmore LJ noted in his ruling:

See also

English land law
English trusts law
English property law

References

Further reading
 
  (summarizing nature of Silven ruling)

English land case law
Court of Appeal (England and Wales) cases
2003 in England
2003 in case law
Mortgage industry of the United Kingdom
2003 in British law
NatWest Group litigation